Storeatula is a genus of cryptophytes.

It includes the species Storeatula major.

References

Cryptomonad genera